Xylorhizini is a tribe of longhorn beetles of the subfamily Lamiinae. It was described by Lacordaire in 1872.

Taxonomy
 Aetholopus Pascoe, 1865
 Cymatura Gerstäcker, 1855
 Cyrtogrammus Gressitt, 1939
 Grammoxyla Aurivillius, 1911
 Monstropalpus Franz, 1954
 Parathylactus Breuning & de Jong, 1941
 Thylactus Pascoe, 1866
 Xylorhiza Dejean, 1835

References

 
Lamiinae